Patrick Rieupeyrout (24 May 1951 – 11 March 2021) was a French sailor who competed in the 1972 Summer Olympics.

References

1951 births
2021 deaths
French male sailors (sport)
Olympic sailors of France
Sailors at the 1972 Summer Olympics – Dragon